The Ancient Votive Stones of Pesaro are 13 sandstone rocks that were unearthed in 1737 in a Pesaro, Italy farm field owned by Patrician Annibale degli Abati Olivieri.  Oliverio dug up the stones at the site of his newly discovered Lucus Pisaurensis Sacred Grove on his property at Il Pignocco in Pesaro.

These votive stones were incised in a pre-Estrucan script, each bearing the name of an early Roman god.  APOLLO, the Sun-God; MAT[ER]-MATVTA, an ancient semone divinity of luci; FIDE, an ancient goddess of High Divinity status, and IVNONII (Juno), a goddess of multiple origin myths, are a few of the names inscribed on the stones.  They are estimated to date from c. 400 BC, a time when Pesaro was called by its Latin name of Pisaurum.

The stones are on display at the Museo Oliveriano, a Library and Museum in Pesaro housing the collections of Annibale degli Abati Olivieri, Giovanni Battista Passeri, and Giulio Perticari.

Etymology 
Pesaro (Italian), fr. Pisaurum (latin), pis (pi π, plural) + (aurum, reflecting gold).

See also 
Votive offering {see section on Ancient Offerings}
Pesaro, Italy, {see section on History}
Annibale degli Abati Olivieri
Lucus Pisaurensis, the Sacred Grove of Santa Venerada in Pesaro, Italy
:it:Santa Veneranda (Pesaro)

Further reading 
Lucus Pisaurensis:  The Sacred Grove of Il Pignocco in Pesaro, Italy, discovered by Annibale degli Abati Olivieri, http://www.ilpignocco.it/en/about-us/lucus-pisaurensis/

References 

Pesaro
Archaeology of Italy